Reflections is a 2005 short silent film written, produced and directed by Bejoy Nambiar, starring Mohanlal, Juhi Babbar, and Vidula Bhave.

Plot
Mohanlal plays the main character, a loner who looks at those around him and daydreams about what his life could be like, putting himself in the place of those who are more fulfilled than he is.

Cast

 Mohanlal
 Juhi Babbar
 Vidula Bhave
 Sunil Santanam
 Ahlam Khan
 Jaideep Pandit

Production
Reflections is the debut directorial of Bejoy Nambiar. The film was shot in three days, the post-production was completed in eight months.

References

External links
 

Indian short films
2005 films
Silent films
Films directed by Bejoy Nambiar